James Neilson Corry (15 February 1895 – 11 July 1968) was a Liberal party member of the House of Commons of Canada. He was born in Britton, Ontario and became a farmer by career.

Corry served in the military during World War I with the 10th Canadian Infantry. He was wounded on two occasions during the war.

He was first elected to Parliament at the Perth riding in the 1949 general election. After one term in office he was defeated by Jay Monteith of the Progressive Conservative party in the 1953 federal election.

References

External links
 

1895 births
1968 deaths
Canadian farmers
Canadian military personnel of World War I
Liberal Party of Canada MPs
Members of the House of Commons of Canada from Ontario
People from Perth County, Ontario